Matana is a village in Sutrapada Taluka, Gir Somnath district of Gujarat state, India.

Villages in Gir Somnath district